Carol Rodland is an American viola player who studied with Karen Tuttle at the Juilliard School.  She was Tuttle's teaching assistant for several years before taking a position as a viola teacher at the New England Conservatory. In February 2008, it was announced that Rodland would join the faculty at the Eastman School of Music for the Fall 2008 semester, replacing the retiring John Graham. She is a recipient of a Fulbright grant.

External links
 Bio on the Eastman School of Music website

American classical violists
Women violists
Juilliard School alumni
Year of birth missing (living people)
Living people
New England Conservatory faculty
Eastman School of Music faculty
Place of birth missing (living people)